Tania Vicent (born January 13, 1976, in Laval, Quebec) is a Canadian short track speed skater, who competed at the 2006 Winter Olympics.  On February 22, along with Alanna Kraus, Anouk Leblanc-Boucher and Kalyna Roberge, Vicent won a silver medal for Canada in the 3000m relay. She won the bronze medal in Nagano and at Salt Lake City.

She won her fourth consecutive Olympic 3,000 metre relay medal at the 2010 Winter Olympics, skating alongside Jessica Gregg, Kalyna Roberge and Marianne St-Gelais.

References

External links 
CBC.ca Bio
Tania Vicent on Real Champions

1976 births
Living people
Canadian female short track speed skaters
Short track speed skaters at the 1998 Winter Olympics
Short track speed skaters at the 2002 Winter Olympics
Short track speed skaters at the 2006 Winter Olympics
Short track speed skaters at the 2010 Winter Olympics
Olympic bronze medalists for Canada
Olympic silver medalists for Canada
Sportspeople from Laval, Quebec
Olympic short track speed skaters of Canada
Olympic medalists in short track speed skating
Canadian female speed skaters
Medalists at the 2010 Winter Olympics
Medalists at the 2006 Winter Olympics
Medalists at the 2002 Winter Olympics
Medalists at the 1998 Winter Olympics
21st-century Canadian women